Maghazi may refer to:

 al-maghazi, a genre of prophetic biography in Islamic literature
 Maghazi (camp), a Palestinian refugee camp in the Gaza Strip